Live at the Blank Canvas is the first live DVD album by British rock band The Music, released in the United Kingdom on 1 September 2003 (see 2003 in music). The DVD is a live recording of the band's homecoming date; the last of that year's UK tour. The DVD contains short interview segments with the band interspersed between the live songs.

The performance of "Turn Out the Light" from this show was used as a b-side on The Truth is No Words single.

The DVD has no additional bonus features, except for a DVD-ROM web link with access to exclusive online content, but has since been taken offline.

Track listing
All tracks written by The Music.

Live at the Blank Canvas
"The Dance"
"Jag Tune"
"The Truth Is No Words"
"Human"
"Let Love Be The Healer"
"New Instrumental"
"Turn Out The Light"
"The People"
"Too High"
"Take The Long Road And Walk It"
"Disco"
"The Walls Get Smaller"

External links
Official UK site

The Music (band) video albums
Live video albums
2003 live albums
2003 video albums
Virgin Records live albums
Virgin Records video albums